Shell Pocket is a rural locality in the Cassowary Coast Region, Queensland, Australia.

Geography

Shell Pocket is situated between the mountains of the Great Dividing Range on either side and Big Maria Creek in the valley below. Many spring fed streams sourced in the mountains feed the waterway and, beside the high rainfall, ensure permanent water all year round. Like most of the Wet Tropics region in Far North Queensland, Shell Pocket mainly produces sugarcane.

History

References 

Cassowary Coast Region
Localities in Queensland